Kambali is a community in Wa municipality in the Upper West Region of Ghana.History had it that natives of this community migrated from part of northern region and settle in the village of Bulenga in the present day Fusi District of the Upper West Region of Ghana.

The great-grandfather of Kambali was Guriseu who settled in Bulenga with his brother and later moved to Jambere where the circuit court is located and the Municipal police head office is located the settle for many years leaving his brother at Bulenga and by traditional rules of land first settlers are the owner of the land hence the people of kambali are the landlords of Wa township but thus it stay there no, as time goes on one day the great-grandfather of the present day Kambali was hunting with his two sons Saanpiya and Youne somewhere around the present day Wa Municipal health insurance office their luck shine they had a lot of animal amongst this animal was a very big antelope(known in the waale language as Walupialaa) so it was in the course of skinning this walupialaa that an old man with Grey hair and long mustache like tical olden days worries with his long metal Which has a shape pointed edge normal use in fighting. The old man use sign language to greet Guriseu, Guriseu upon reply then there follows another question asking how long he had stay here which he reply for many years then the old said he is barley seven day in the jurisdiction with his family and they stay north of where they standing by then the children of Guriseu had skinned the animal Guriseu ask his children to cut the back leg and the chest to the old man as tradition demand but his children did not understand after cutting they started grumbling why they should that much to the old man and their father explain to them that because he older than him and that they had to start from that day showing respect to the old man hence the people of suuŕiyir and puuhuu ýiri Are seniors to the people of kambali and as such the heads of the landlord of Wa municipality then the people of kambali follows. Puuhuu and suuri were the two son of the old man which form the two families.

References 

Populated places in the Northern Region (Ghana)